Life is Elsewhere is the second studio album by Newcastle band Little Comets. The album was released on 15 October 2012. It includes the singles "Worry", "Jennifer" and "A Little Opus".

Track listing

Personnel
 Robert Coles – Lead Vocals & Guitar
 Michael Coles – Lead Guitar
 Matthew 'the cat' Hall – Bass
 Greenie – Drums
 George Daniel – Drums on track 3

References

Little Comets albums
2012 albums
Experimental pop albums